Gastrodelphyidae is a family of parasitic copepods.

Genera

The family contains three genera:

Chonephilus 
Gastrodelphys 
Sabellacheres

References

External links
World of copepods

Poecilostomatoida
Crustacean families